Lalithadripura is a suburb of Mysore city in Karnataka state of India.

Location
Lalithadripura is located on the eastern side of Mysore city near the Chamundi Hills. It has a post office and the PIN code is 570027.

Demographics
There are 4124  people in Lalithadripura village according to 2011 census.

See also
 Mysore Race Course

References

Suburbs of Mysore